The women's 400 metres at the 2012 African Championships in Athletics was held at the Stade Charles de Gaulle on 27, 28 and 29 June.

Medalists

Records

Schedule

Results

Round 1
First 4 in each heat (Q) and 4 best performers (q) advance to the Semifinals.

Semifinals
First 2 in each heat (Q) and 2 best performers (q) advance to the Final.

Final

References

Results

400 Women
400 metres at the African Championships in Athletics
2012 in women's athletics